The 2000 All-Ireland Under-21 Hurling Championship final was a hurling match that was played at Semple Stadium, Thurles on 17 September 2000 to determine the winners of the 2000 All-Ireland Under-21 Hurling Championship, the 37th season of the All-Ireland Under-21 Hurling Championship, a tournament organised by the Gaelic Athletic Association for the champion teams of the four provinces of Ireland. The final was contested by Limerick of Munster and Galway of Connacht, with Limerick winning by 1-13 to 0-13.

Match

Details

References

2000 in hurling
All-Ireland Under-21 Hurling Championship Finals
Limerick GAA matches
Galway GAA matches